The Golden Banana (also called: Sun Belt) is an area of higher population density lying between Cartagena in the west and Genoa in the east along the coast of the Mediterranean Sea. 

The area runs along the Mediterranean coast, including the French cities of Nice, Marseille, Montpellier the Spanish cities of Barcelona to Valencia. It was defined by the "Europe 2000" report from the European Commission in 1995 similarly to the Blue Banana.

Description 
The region is characterized by its importance in activities related to information and communication technologies, in terms of quality of life and as a top travel destination. At any rate, the Golden Banana can also be understood as an extension of the Blue Banana over the Mediterranean arc. 

The golden banana has development axes extending into the area of the upper Adriatic around Trieste. This also relates to the trade flows of the maritime Silk Road or the Chinese Belt and Road Initiative and its developments to Central Europe.

See also
 Blue Banana
 Four Motors for Europe
 List of metropolitan areas in the European Union by GDP

References

Further reading
 

Urban studies and planning terminology
Human habitats
Economic regions of Europe
Geographical neologisms